The Pietersburg Pillars was a South African football club.

The club was renamed the City Pillars after the South African government changed the name of the town where the team was based from Pietersberg to Polokwane on 25 February 2005. In December 2006, the franchise was sold to the Morfou brothers who wished to re-introduce the Mpumalanga Black Aces brand to the league following the original club's demise in 2002.

References 

Defunct soccer clubs in South Africa
Association football clubs established in 2000
National First Division clubs
2000 establishments in South Africa